Independencia District may refer to the following districts of Peru:

 Independencia District, Huaraz
 Independencia District, Vilcas Huamán
 Independencia District, Pisco
 Independencia District, Lima

See also
 Independencia (disambiguation)